"Spread My Wings" is the title of a number-one R&B single by Troop.  As the second single taken from the album Attitude, the song spent two weeks at number one on the U.S. R&B chart.

See also
 R&B number-one hits of 1990 (USA)

References

1990 singles
New jack swing songs
1990 songs
Atlantic Records singles
Songs written by Chuckii Booker